is a 1987 Japanese animated film, directed by Tetsuo Imazawa.

Plot
The story happened on a fictional island called "Chironup" (fox in Ainu language) in the Northern Japan. Two foxes were born around the time the fox-cherry blossoms (a made-up flower from the original book) bloomed in spring. Ken, the father, and Chin, the mother, lived in peace, naming the boy Kang and the girl Koro. Every year, at this time of year, an elderly fisherman couple comes to pick kelp. In front of the Jizo, they met Koro, who had fallen apart from their parents, and then they loved them like their own children. One day, the old couple accidentally met Koro's parents outside. Despite them loving Koro very much, they still decided to let Koro return to his family.

In the fall, the war became fierce every day, and soldiers came to the island. The soldiers want fox fur, and Kang and Ken are shot with guns. Koro also falls into a trap set by the soldiers and is unable to move. Chin carried food to such a roller with all his might. Eventually it was winter and it began to snow. Chin has difficulty walking and cannot carry food. Snow falls on the hugging chin and roller. Time has passed, the war is over, and spring has come. The old couple, who returned to Chironup Island, found the fox-cherry blossoms blooming together like two parent-child foxes. There was a bell collar that fisherman's wife put on Koro's neck by her side. The old woman picked up the collar and hugged it for a long time, and blessed the fox family who died.

Cast

References

External links
 

1987 anime films
Group TAC
Films based on works by Japanese writers
Films about foxes
Animated films about foxes